Raito is an Italian hamlet (frazione) of the municipality of Vietri sul Mare in the Province of Salerno, Campania. It is part of the Amalfi Coast and its population is 996.

Geography
Raito is located on a hillside under the Lattari Mountains and upon the Tyrrhenian Coast and the Amalfi Drive. It is located on a road linking  (1,1 km in the east) to Vietri sul Mare (2 km in the east), and is 6 km far from Cetara, 7 from Cava de' Tirreni, 7,5 from Salerno and 21 from Amalfi. Its inhabited area counts some scattered houses upon the coast and is close to the beach of Marina d'Albori.

Gallery

Personalities
Antonio Savastano (1948-1991): tenor, died in Raito in which he lived from 1980s

See also
Sorrentine Peninsula

References

External links

 Raito website

Frazioni of the Province of Salerno
Amalfi Coast